Symphony of Fate (Chinese: 命运交响曲) is a 2011 Chinese television series starring Yang Mi and Feng Shaofeng. It is a remake of the South Korean drama Cinderella's Sister (2010). The series was broadcast by AHTV and SHTV from 3 October to 18 October 2011.

Plot
This is the story of two sisters named Anqi (Yang Mi) and Anna (Guo Zhenni). Their dream was to be a famous fashion designer, but fate interred with their lives. They fell in love with the same man- Liu Chenxi (Feng Shaofeng). Anna decided to go to Shanghai to pursue a higher degree. Anqi, who failed the Gaokao exam, met a fashion designer named Zhao Tianyou (Zhang Lunshuo). Three years later, Anna was jealous of Anqi's success in her life. Anna replaced Anqi to become a famous model, and Anqi became a custodian. The kind Anqi never blamed her sister and knew that she needed Anna as a sister. Anqi's designs were approved by Zhao Tianyou and he helped Anqi's self-esteem. Even though Anna kept on hurting Anqi, Anqi forgived her every time and eventually defeated Anna. Anqi helped Anna on her career, and the two sisters found their respective happiness.

Cast
 Yang Mi as Hao Anqi, the protagonist and Anna's sister
 Feng Shaofeng as Liu Chenxi, likes Anqi but died in a car accident
 Guo Zhenni as Hao Anna, Anqi's ambitious sister
 Chi Shuai as Song Chenghao, Anna's ex and Anqi's new boyfriend
 Gao Hao as Yin Haoming, loves Anna
 Zhang Lunshuo as Zhao Tianyou, a famous designer
 Amanda Chou as Liu Yunxi
 Tao Huimin as An Qi's mother
 Chen Weimin as An Qi's father
 Zuo Ling as Liu Jiayu
 Zhu Yushuo as Jian Xiaoai

Soundtrack

References

External links

2011 Chinese television series debuts
Chinese romance television series
Chinese television series based on South Korean television series
Television series by Huace Media